Enteromius sensitivus is a species of ray-finned fish in the genus Enteromius which is found only in the Sanaga River in Cameroon.

Footnotes 

 

Endemic fauna of Cameroon
Enteromius
Taxa named by Tyson R. Roberts
Fish described in 2010